Dublin South-West is a parliamentary constituency represented in Dáil Éireann, the lower house of the Irish parliament or Oireachtas. The constituency elects 5 deputies (Teachtaí Dála, commonly known as TDs) on the system of proportional representation by means of the single transferable vote (PR-STV).

Constituency profile
The constituency leans towards left-wing parties such as the Labour Party and Sinn Féin. Both Labour party TDs elected in 2011 had been members of other left-wing parties: Pat Rabbitte of the Workers' Party and Democratic Left, and Eamonn Maloney was a member of the Jim Kemmy's Democratic Socialist Party. With the departure of Brian Hayes in 2014, the constituency was entirely represented by four left-of-centre TDs upon the election of Paul Murphy of the Anti-Austerity Alliance in the 2014 by-election.

The constituency is noted for its volatility: in three consecutive general elections, the poll topper from the previous election lost his seat, Brian Hayes in 2002, Seán Crowe in 2007 and Conor Lenihan in 2011.

History and boundaries
The first constituency of this name was created by the Electoral (Amendment) Act 1947. It was based in Dublin city and was in use at elections from 1948 to 1977.

A second constituency of this name was created by the Electoral (Amendment) Act 1980, and has been in use since the 1981 general election. It was in a different area to the 1948–1977 constituency, being based in County Dublin (South Dublin, after the division of County Dublin in 1994), in the areas of Clondalkin, Newcastle, Rathcoole, Saggart, Tallaght, Templeogue, and parts of Terenure. At the 2002 election, it was reduced in size and electorate, losing territory — including Newcastle, Rathcoole, Saggart and Clondalkin — to the new Dublin Mid-West constituency. Major areas today include Rathfarnham, Tallaght, and Templeogue, with the surrounding suburbs of Ballyboden, Ballyroan, Butterfield, Firhouse, Greenhills, Knocklyon, Willbrook, and parts of Terenure. At the 2016 general election, it gained a seat to become a five-seat constituency, with the addition of part of the former Dublin South constituency, around Rathfarnham.

TDs

TDs 1948–1977

TDs since 1981

Elections

2020 general election

2016 general election

2014 by-election

2011 general election

2007 general election

2002 general election

1997 general election

1992 general election

1989 general election

1987 general election

November 1982 general election

February 1982 general election

1981 general election

1976 by-election
Following the death of Fianna Fáil TD Noel Lemass, a by-election was held on 10 June 1976. The seat was won by the Labour Party candidate Brendan Halligan.

1973 general election

1970 by-election
Following the death of Labour Party TD Seán Dunne, a by-election was held on 4 March 1970. The seat was won by the Fianna Fáil candidate Seán Sherwin.

1969 general election

1965 general election

1961 general election

1959 by-election
Following the death of Fianna Fáil TD Bernard Butler, a by-election was held on 22 July 1959. The seat was won by the Fine Gael candidate Richie Ryan.

1957 general election

1956 by-election
Following the death of Fine Gael TD Peadar Doyle, a by-election was held on 14 November 1956. The seat was won by the Fianna Fáil candidate Noel Lemass.

1954 general election

1951 general election

1948 general election

See also
Elections in the Republic of Ireland
Politics of the Republic of Ireland
List of Dáil by-elections
List of political parties in the Republic of Ireland

References

External links
 Oireachtas Constituency Dashboards
 Oireachtas Members Database
 Government of Ireland: Constituency Maps (Current)
 Dublin Historic Maps: Parliamentary & Dail Constituencies 1780–1969 (a work in progress.)
 Dublin Historic Maps: Some Dublin and Kingstown Wards, Between 1780 and 1954

Dáil constituencies
Parliamentary constituencies in County Dublin
Tallaght
Terenure
Clondalkin
Templeogue
Politics of South Dublin (county)
1948 establishments in Ireland
1977 disestablishments in Ireland
Constituencies established in 1948
Constituencies disestablished in 1977
1981 establishments in Ireland
Constituencies established in 1981